The Seinäjoki City Hall is the main municipal administrative building in the city of Seinäjoki, Finland. It is notable for having been designed by the renowned Finnish architect Alvar Aalto.

Architecture
The building is based on Aalto's 1959 winning entry into a design contest for the new Seinäjoki urban plan, and was completed three years later in 1962. It was comprehensively renovated in the 2010s, with the work finished in 2018.

The exterior cladding of the main facade features dark blue ceramic tiles which appear to change colour under different lighting conditions.

The city council assembly hall was designed to serve a dual purpose as a concert venue.

The City Hall forms part of the city's so-called Aalto Centre (Finnish: Aalto-keskus), a cluster of Aalto-designed public buildings and an integral central square, which has been recognised by the Finnish Heritage Agency as a nationally important built cultural environment (Valtakunnallisesti merkittävä rakennettu kulttuuriympäristö).

See also
Aalto Centre, Seinäjoki
Rovaniemi city hall

References

External links
The Administrative and Cultural Centre in Seinäjoki on Alvar Aalto Foundation website
City Hall on City of Seinäjoki website

Alvar Aalto buildings
Modernist architecture in Finland
Seinäjoki
City and town halls in Finland
Buildings and structures in South Ostrobothnia
Government buildings completed in 1962